Mary Bridget Luba (born August 20, 1993) is an American professional soccer midfielder who played for Chicago Red Stars in NWSL. She is a graduate of engineering from Marquette University and played collegiate soccer for Marquette Golden Eagles.

Early life
Raised in Shorewood, Wisconsin with three older siblings, Luba attended Shorewood High School.<ref
name=wisbio></ref> Luba is afraid of heights and likes kites.

Marquette University
Luba attended Marquette University where she majored in engineering and played for the Golden Eagles in Big East Conference. In 2013, Luba was named to several Big East honorary teams including the Big East All-Academic Team; All-BIG EAST Second Team; NSCAA Women's NCAA Division I All-Northeast Region Third Team; NSCAA Scholar All-North/Central Region First Team; Big East All-Tournament team; and was also named Outstanding Offensive Player of the Big East Tournament. 
In 2014, Luba was named to All-Big East First Team, as well as to NSCAA NCAA Division I Women's All-Northeast Region second team.

Playing career

Club
In 2015, Luba was eligible for National Women's Soccer League college draft. She  played for the Chicago Red Stars during the preseason in 2015.

During the regular season while several team members of Chicago Red Stars were away representing United States women's national soccer team at
2015 FIFA Women's World Cup Luba made her debut in National Women's Soccer League. Luba also played for the Chicago Red Stars Reserves team and won the Women's Premier Soccer League national championship in July 2015. On September 2, 2015, Chicago Red Stars announced the signing of Mary Luba for the remainder of 2015 Chicago Red Stars season, just one game before the end of regular season.

In October 2017, Chicago Red Stars waived Luba to make room for Yūki Nagasato on the roster.

International
In July 2014, Luba was invited to the training camp of United States under-23 women's national soccer team by coach Steve Swanson.

References

External links
 Chicago Red Stars player profile
 Marquette player profile
 

1993 births
Living people
American women's soccer players
Chicago Red Stars players
National Women's Soccer League players
Women's association football midfielders
Soccer players from Wisconsin
Marquette Golden Eagles women's soccer players
Shorewood High School (Wisconsin) alumni